Sliema is a town located on the northeast coast of Malta in the Northern Harbour District. It is a major residential and commercial area and a centre for shopping, bars, dining, and café life. It is also the most densely populated town on the island.

Lining the coastline is a promenade known as the Sliema Front that has become the ideal spot for joggers and walkers as well as a prolific meeting place for locals during the summer season. Romantic moon strolls, barbeques and open air restaurants and cafes have made Sliema the hub of social nightlife. Sliema is also known for its numerous rocky beaches, water sports and hotels.

Sliema, which means 'peace, comfort', was once a quiet fishing village on the peninsula across Marsamxett Harbour from Valletta and has views of the capital city. The population began to grow in 1853 and the town was declared a parish in 1878. Now Sliema and the coastline up to neighbouring St. Julian's constitutes Malta's main coastal resort.

Sliema is considered a desirable place to live and is relatively affluent, with extremely high property prices compared to the national average. Historically, stylish villas and traditional Maltese townhouses lined the streets of Sliema. Sliema has now been ringed with modern apartment blocks, some of which are amongst the tallest buildings in Malta. This has resulted in significant traffic, parking and construction-related noise pollution issues.

Residents of Sliema are stereotypically known for their usage of English as a first language, although this is changing in the 21st century due to demographic shifts.

Etymology

 is the Maltese word meaning peace and was used to salute someone. The triconsonantal root of the word is Š-L-M.

Sliema may have gotten its name from the Our Lady of Good Voyage Chapel, that now no longer exists. It periodically served as a reference point for the sailors and fishermen in Marsamxett Harbour. The construction age of the church is unknown but it was included in a map by the Order of St. John even before being handed the Maltese islands to them.

There is also a possibility that the origin is from an Arabic first name or a Hebrew family name.

History

The Knights of Malta Period
At the Great Siege of 1565, il-Qortin, as it was then known, was a camp centre for Turkish troops led by Dragut. He met his fate there, having been killed by a bombardment from Fort St. Elmo at the other flank of Marsamxett Harbour, where Sliema stands. Fort Tigné was eventually built by the Knights of St. John in the late 18th century and further developed by the British in later years.

78980
In 1855 a new church dedicated to Our Lady Star of the Sea ("Stella Maris") was opened to public worship. Around the new church, the small village grew into a town.  By 1878, the population grew to such an extent that the religious authorities had the Stella Maris Church declared a parish in its own right and it was separated from St.Helen's parish of Birkirkara.

The town began to develop rapidly in the second half of the 19th century, becoming popular as a summer resort for wealthier Valletta residents. Their elegant villas and town houses lined the quiet, inland streets. Various Victorian buildings graced its three-kilometre sea promenade which overlooked rugged rocks, farms and even a small sandy beach.

A few Victorian, as well as art nouveau houses, still remain in the inner streets, although only a handful remain along the shoreline, as there has been significant modern development of apartment blocks and hotels.  A distinctive group of six traditional houses with Maltese balconies has survived remarkably intact at Belvedere Terrace, set back from Ix-Xatt (the Strand).  These houses overlook Manoel Island to the South across the Sliema Creek; the houses have heritage protection and the lower buildings between them and Ix-Xatt cannot be built upwards.

The British built a number of fortifications on the Sliema peninsula in the 19th century. These were Sliema Point Battery (1872–76), Cambridge Battery (1878–86) and Garden Battery (1889–94). In addition, the 18th century Fort Tigné remained in use as well, and barracks were built on the Tigné peninsula.

In 1881 the first sea water distillery on the island was erected in Sliema in order to provide water to the Tigné barracks. In 1882 the distillery was decommissioned and the building, which still stands today, has been occupied by a printing press since that time. The barracks it supplied water to were demolished in 2001 in order to make way for the development of Tigné Point development.

The town has a considerable number of streets connected with the British era in Malta, such as Norfolk Street, Amery Street, Windsor Terrace, Graham Street, Milner Street and Fort Cambridge.

In 1941, during the Second world war Siege of Malta, Sliema was hit by some Axis bombers during an air raid that caused the death of 21 civilians.

Post-Independence
Sliema has been the site of intensive development in recent decades. The Victorian houses that lined Tower Road have all been replaced by apartment buildings built in modern architectural style. Several of these have views of the Mediterranean Sea or Valletta but their development has been controversial. The promenade has been upgraded in the late 1990s and is a common spot for leisurely walking, particularly on warm summer nights when it remains crowded into the early hours of the morning. Shopping is primarily centred in an area called the Ferries (the Strand or ix-Xatt, Tower Road and Bisazza Street) and the more recently opened Tigne Point shopping mall. Restaurants and cafes can be found along the promenade.

Development, high population density, parking issues, and high property prices have led many younger people originally from the area are choosing to live elsewhere on the island and consequently Sliema is suffering from an aging population. There are several foreign expatriates who reside in Sliema. There remains net inward migration to Sliema. The prevalence of use amongst Sliema residents of English as a first language is decreasing although remains significantly higher than other localities on the island. Code-switching in English sentences with peppered Maltese words and phrases is relatively common in Sliema, as well as St. Julian's, Pembroke, Swieqi, Madliena, San Ġwann and Kappara, although there are several individuals who speak exclusively in English or Maltese without mixing the two (see Maltenglish). There are a number of Maltese people who are fluent in English but struggle with the Maltese language, and this reflects use of English at home and at English-speaking schools. Despite some misconceptions and stereotypes, the vast majority of people from Sliema are fluent in Maltese and speak it as a first language.

Population and notable residents
The population of Sliema is over 20,000 and has a significant turnover of foreign expatriates who reside temporarily.  The town was the residence of the late Giorgio Borġ Olivier, former prime minister and architect of Malta's independence and the temporary residence of Manwel Dimech who was one of Malta's foremost revolutionary thinkers at the turn of the 20th century. He died in exile in Egypt and Lower Prince of Wales Road was renamed in his honour. Tas-Sliema is also the hometown of footballer Michael Mifsud and music artist Ira Losco.

Due to the iGaming industry's introduction in Malta, Sliema has also seen a huge influx of foreigners, primarily from Scandinavia.

It was the birthplace of several famous people: former prime minister Alfred Sant; Michael Falzon of the Malta Labour Party; George Stivala, High Commissioner for Malta in Australia during the 1950s and 1960s; Archbishop George Caruana (1882–1951), the venerable Don Nazzareno Camilleri (1906–1973), British journalist Peter Hitchens, vocalist Marc Storace of the Swiss heavy metal band Krokus, and Dublin-based singer/songwriter Adrian Crowley.

Irish billionaire Denis O'Brien has a "residential address" as Flat 6/60, Suite F, Tigne Street in Sliema, according to O'Brien's own filing with the Companies Registration Office (CRO). The Maltese-born, American-naturalized actor Joseph Calleia lived in Sliema from his retirement in 1963 to his death in 1975.

John A. Gauci-Maistre, Maltese businessperson
Evelyn Bonaci, Maltese politician

Education
A list of schools in Sliema:

St. Joseph School Sliema
St. Francis Girl's Secondary School
St. Dorothys
St Patricks
Ursuline Creche
St Benilds
Government Primary School

English Language Schools
Language Studies International (LSI)
Geos English Language School
 School of Languages
Linguatime School of English – Tower Road
IELS – Mattew Pulis Street
AM Language School
ECS English Communication School
English Language Academy
Maltalingua
LAL - Language Centres Malta

Landmarks
 Stella Maris Church (Our Lady Star of the Sea) – Mother Parish of Sliema, est 1878
 Sacro Cuor Parish Church (Our Lady of the Sacred Heart)
 Gesu' Nazzarenu Parish Church
 San Girgor Parish Church
 The Chapel of Our Lady of Graces
 Fort Tigné
 Tigné Point
 Sliema Point Battery (Il-Fortizza)
 St. Julian's Tower
 Palazzo Capua
 Exiles Beach
 Independence Gardens (Ġnien l-Independenza)
 The Three Trees (It-tlett Siġriet)
 Chalet (now demolished)

Churches

In addition to the above list of churches, is the Anglican Holy Trinity Church Built in 1866 in Rudolphe Street.

Feasts
Like all Maltese towns and villages, the annual Sliema parish feasts are popular especially those held in honour of the Our Lady Stella Maris (August) and Our Lady of the Sacred Heart (Madonna tas-Sacro Cuor) in July. Other feasts celebrated in the locality are those in honour of  Our Lady of Mount Carmel (July) and St. Gregory (September).

Band clubs
Sliema also has four band clubs which take part in the parish feasts held in the summer months and are active all year round. These societies are Stella Maris Band Club (founded in 1914), The "Societa' Filarmonica SLIEMA" Band Club (founded in 1923). Mount Carmel Band Club (1987) and St. Gregory Band Club (1987).

Sports
Tas-Sliema's football club, Sliema Wanderers is one of the most successful on the island, having won the domestic league no less than 26 times. The Football nursery can be found in the Tigne Sports Complex.  Sliema Aquatic Sports Club is also the leading club in water polo, winning a total of 31 leagues and 25 cups since 1912. Their main rivals are the Balluta Bay Side Neptunes WPSC. Sliema Aquatic Sports Club is not only a water polo club but also a swimming club from where many famous swimmers trained and also became national record holders. Another team hailing from Sliema is Exiles S.C.

Furthermore, Sliema is also represented in Rugby by Stompers RFC. Sliema Fight Co., based within the Preluna Hotel complex also has its own Boxing and Mixed Martial Arts team.

Scouting
The 1st Sliema Scout Group (Bernard's Own) is the oldest surviving Scout Group outside the United Kingdom and was founded in 1909 by Sir Edgar Bernardth and are still a major influence on Scouting in Malta.

Over the years, the Sliema Group has collected a wealth of scouting tradition and has proudly passed this knowledge on from generation to generation.

Zones in Tas-Sliema
The Ferries
Font Għadir
Fortina
Għar id-Dud
Qui-Si-Sana
Savoy
Surfside
The Strand
Tlett Siġriet
Lazy Corner
Tigné Point
Exiles

Transport
Sliema is served by Malta Public Transport including route X2 which serves Malta International Airport.

Sliema's main roads include:
Ix-Xatt (The Strand)
Triq Bisazza (Bisazza Street – a pedestrian commercial street)
Triq il-Kbira (Main Street)
Triq it-Torri (Tower Road)
Triq Manwel Dimech (Manoel Dimech Street)
Triq Rudolfu (Rodolph Street)
Triq Sir Adrian Dingli (Sir Adrian Dingli Street)
Xatt ta' Tigné (Tigné Waterfront)
Xatt ta' Qui-Si-Sana (Qui-Si-Sana Waterfront)
Pjazza Annunzjata
Pjazza Sant'Anna

Twin towns – sister cities

Sliema is twinned with:
 Białystok, Poland
 Muret, France

References

External links

 Sliema Local Council

 
Articles containing video clips
Local councils of Malta
Towns in Malta